The 2017–18 Hong Kong Sapling Cup (officially the 2017–18 R&F Properties Sapling Cup for sponsorship reasons) was the 3rd edition of the Sapling Cup. The Cup was contested by the 10 teams in the 2017–18 Hong Kong Premier League. Kitchee were crowned champions after defeating Tai Po in the final.

The objective of the Cup was to create more potential playing opportunities for youth players. In this Cup competition, each team played a minimum of two players born on or after 1 January 1996 (U22) and six foreign players at most during every whole match, with no more than four foreign players on the pitch at the same time.

Calendar

Results

Group stage

Group A

Group B

Semi-finals

Final

External links
 Hong Kong Sapling Cup – Hong Kong Football Association

Notes

References

2017–18 domestic association football cups
Lea
 Hong Kong Sapling Cup